Battleship Island is a  island just off the northwest tip of Henry Island, in the San Juan Archipelago. The entire island is a Washington State bird sanctuary.  The name is derived from the resemblance that the island and its trees have to a ship with masts, particularly when viewed at a distance from the east or west.

See also
 
 

San Juan Islands
Protected areas of San Juan County, Washington
Uninhabited islands of Washington (state)